Chai Pani is an Indian street food restaurant based in Asheville, North Carolina, and the 2022 winner of the James Beard Foundation Award for "Outstanding Restaurant". It was founded in 2009 by chef Meherwan Irani and his wife Molly. They opened a second location in Decatur, Georgia in March 2013, which first copied the original's menu but now focuses on the cuisine of India's Deccan Plateau, where Meherwan spent his childhood.

See also 

 List of Indian restaurants

References

Culture of Asheville, North Carolina
Decatur, Georgia
Indian restaurants in the United States
Indian-American culture in Georgia (U.S. state)
Indian-American culture in North Carolina
James Beard Foundation Award winners
Restaurants in Georgia (U.S. state)
Restaurants in North Carolina
Street food in the United States